Vittoria was launched at Shields in 1812. She spent much of her career sailing as a transport, primarily across the Atlantic, though she visited Malta once. She disappeared in late 1830.

Career
Vittoria first appeared in Lloyd's Register (LR) in 1819. She may have served as a government transport before that.

Fate
Vittoria disappeared without a trace in the second half of 1830 on her return voyage to London from Honduras. In November it was reported that she had been missing since 1 August. Lloyd's Register for 1831 had the annotation "missing" under her entry.

Citations

1812 ships
Age of Sail merchant ships of England
Missing ships
Ships lost with all hands